The League of Communists of Kosovo was the Kosovo branch of the League of Communists of Yugoslavia, the sole legal party of Yugoslavia from 1945 to 1990.

History and background
Unlike the various factions throughout Yugoslavia which composed the League of Communists of Yugoslavia, the Communist Party of Kosovo  was founded in 1944 after the new country was formed. The status of an honorary autonomous province was presented to ethnic Albanian communists who helped the Yugoslav partisans in their struggles during World War II, carved out from the section of the former Ottoman province within the Socialist Republic of Serbia (i.e. whilst one chunk of the former province was given to Albania in 1912, the other sections of it were awarded to Yugoslavia's newly created republics: Montenegro and Macedonia). The new party was given the task of running certain local affairs. In 1952, the party was renamed the League of Communists of Kosovo.

From its creation, Kosovo's administration lacked real power. With various revisions of the constitution, the LCK was granted more and more power until when the new constitution was ratified in 1974, greater power was devolved to all branches.

During the early 1990s, growing ethnic tensions between the republics of Yugoslavia led to the breakup of the federal party — the Kosovo Communists wanted to upgrade Kosovo from an autonomous republic within Serbia to the 7th socialist republic of Yugoslavia, with the same status of Croatia, Montenegro, Bosnia, Macedonia, Slovenia and Serbia proper.

On October 12, 1990, it ceased to exist due to amendments to the constitution reverting Kosovo to its pre-1974 status by Slobodan Milosević.

Party leaders 

Miladin Popović (September 1944 - March 1945) (b. 1910 - d.1945)
Đorđije Pajković (March 1945 - February 1956) (b. 1917 - d.1980)          
Dušan Mugoša (February 1956 - 1965) (b. 1914 - d.1973)
Veli Deva (1965 - 28 June 1971) (b. 1923 - d.2015) 
Mahmut Bakalli (28 June 1971 - 6 May 1981) (b. 1936 - d.2006)
Veli Deva (6 May 1981 - June 1982) (b. 1923 - d.2015)    
Sinan Hasani (June 1982 - May 1983) (b. 1922 - d.2010) 
Ilaz Kurteshi (May 1983 - March 1984) (b. 1927 - d.2016)
Svetislav Dolašević (March 1984 - May 1985) (b. 1926 - d.1995)
Kolë Shiroka  (May 1985 - May 1986) (1922 - 1994)
Azem Vllasi (May 1986 - May 1988) (b. 1948)
Kaqusha Jashari (May 1988 - 17 November 1988) (b. 1946) 
Remzi Kolgeci (acting; 17 November 1988 - 27 January 1989) (b. 1947 - d.2011)
Rrahman Morina (27 January 1989 - 12 October 1990) (b. 1943 - d.1990)

See also
History of Kosovo
League of Communists of Yugoslavia
League of Communists of Bosnia and Herzegovina
League of Communists of Croatia
League of Communists of Macedonia
League of Communists of Montenegro
League of Communists of Serbia
League of Communists of Vojvodina
League of Communists of Slovenia
List of leaders of communist Yugoslavia
Socialist Federal Republic of Yugoslavia

References

Communism in Kosovo
Political parties established in 1944
Parties of one-party systems
Defunct political parties in Kosovo
Political parties disestablished in 1990
League of Communists of Yugoslavia
Socialist parties in Kosovo